Studio 54 is a 2018 American documentary film directed by Matt Tyrnauer.

Overview
A documentary about the Studio 54 discotheque in New York City, told from the point of view of Studio 54 co-owner Ian Schrager.

Critical reception
The website's consensus reads, "Studio 54 offers audiences an engrossing close-up look at an emblem of a decade's decadence - as well as its sobering aftermath."

The New York Times wrote, "The movie is a fast account that is sometimes a tad facile in its analysis of a cultural moment. But as Mr. Schrager's personal too-much-too-soon story, it's compelling."

Film Threat said, "This is could be one of the best documentaries I’ve ever reviewed. It’s a cultural piece of history that paints a picture of an era of New York that had a significant effect on the world. And it goes without saying, changed the nightclub industry forever. In fact, there still hasn’t been a club that has even come close to Studio 54 in all this time!"

References

External links

2018 films
2018 documentary films
American documentary films
Disco films
Documentary films about pop music and musicians
Documentary films about New York City
Studio 54
2010s English-language films
2010s American films